General Rafael Buelna International Airport, also known as Mazatlán International Airport, is located in Mazatlán, Sinaloa, Mexico. This airport is the most important in Sinaloa for its international operations, and second to Culiacan International Airport for its domestic operations. It has one terminal with two concourses. It is located on the southeastern edge of the city and it is one of four airports in Mexico which has an Area Control Center 
(Centro Mazatlán/Mazatlán Center); the other ones being Mexico City International Airport, Monterrey International Airport and Mérida International Airport. Mazatlán Center controls air traffic over the northwest part of the country.

The airport moved 1,106,071 passengers in 2021, and 1,450,944 in 2022 according to Grupo Aeroportuario Centro Norte, an increase of 31.18%.

Facilities
 Contact positions: 4
 False Contact positions: 4
 Remote positions: 7
 Number of jetways: 4
 Number of baggage claiming carousels: 4
 Food court (Floor & Upper Level)
 Customs (Arrivals area)
 Taxi & car rentals (Arrivals area)
 Duty Free (Main corridor)
 Parking area

Airlines and destinations

Statistics

Passengers

Busiest routes

See also

 List of the busiest airports in Mexico

References

External links
 Mazatlan International Airport
 Current weather for MMMZ from NOAA

Airports in Sinaloa
Mazatlán